Sivakasi was a Lok Sabha constituency in India which existed until the 2004 Lok sabha elections. It was converted into Virudhunagar constituency after delimitation in 2008.

Assembly segments
Sivakasi Lok Sabha constituency was composed of the following assembly segments:
Sattur (moved to Virudhunagar constituency after 2009)
 Virudhunagar (moved to Virudhunagar constituency after 2009)
 Sivakasi (moved to Virudhunagar constituency after 2009)
Rajapalayam (moved to Tenkasi constituency after 2009)
Srivilliputhur (moved to Tenkasi constituency after 2009)
Kovilpatti (moved to Thoothukudi constituency after 2009)

Members of the Parliament

Election results

General Election 2004

General Election 1999

General Election 1998

General Election 1996

General Election 1991

General Election 1989

General Election 1984

General Election 1980

General Election 1977

General Election 1971

General Election 1967

See also
 Sivakasi
 List of Constituencies of the Lok Sabha

References

External links 
 Election Commission of India

Former Lok Sabha constituencies of Tamil Nadu
Former constituencies of the Lok Sabha
2008 disestablishments in India
Constituencies disestablished in 2008